Christopher Schmidt (born March 1, 1976) is a German-Canadian former professional ice hockey player who last played for the SERC Wild Wings of the DEL2. He also played on the German national team during the 2010 Winter Olympics in Vancouver, British Columbia, Canada.

Career 
Born  in Beaverlodge, Alberta, Schmidt played for DEL club DEG Metro Stars during the 2005–06 season before joining fellow DEL team ERC Ingolstadt during the 2006 offseason. After one year in Bavaria he signed with his third DEL club, the Iserlohn Roosters, where he played for two seasons before joining Mannheim in 2009.

Career statistics

Regular season and playoffs

International

References

External links
 

1976 births
Canadian people of German descent
Ice hockey people from Alberta
Ice hockey players at the 2010 Winter Olympics
Living people
Los Angeles Kings draft picks
Los Angeles Kings players
Olympic ice hockey players of Germany
People from the County of Grande Prairie No. 1
Phoenix Roadrunners (IHL) players
Seattle Thunderbirds players
Canadian ice hockey centres
Canadian ice hockey defencemen